Alex Hutson, known professionally as U-Jean, is an American pop, R&B and hip-hop artist mostly performing in Europe. He is mostly known for features of the songs "Turn This Club Around" and "Summer Jam" by German dance band R.I.O. His debut single "Heaven Is a Place on Earth", a cover of the Belinda Carlisle song, was released on 17 June 2011. The song features vocals from Carlprit.

Biography
He was born in Cleveland, Ohio, and was raised Atlanta, Georgia.  Performing arts has always been his niche in life.

After his schooling, he decided to move to Germany as a U.S. Soldier. Shortly after settling in Darmstadt, Germany, he decided to audition for the U.S. Europe Soldier Show based in Schwetzingen, Germany. After being accepted into the Soldier Show, U-Jean began his professional career as a singer, and immediately began traveling all over Europe, performing over 200 consecutive shows a year, as well as being an ambassador of American music, culture and professionalism in Europe.

U-Jean fell in love with European life and in June 2008, he completed his time and left the army to pursue a life and career in Germany as a singer. He succeeded in starting his career as a professional singer, becoming a member of one of the leading bands in the region, Sweet Soul Music Revue, and has performed at some of the most prestigious and high-profile performances in the world. U-Jean is on the campaign trail for soul, new style, hip-hop and R&B, not only as a singer, but also as a producer and songwriter. U-Jean also performs with The King Kamehameha Band from Frankfurt, Germany. In 2009, he debuted the U-Jean band in Fuerta, Ventura and Jandia, Playa, which he has been involved with for four years and counting, delivering the sweet velvety vocals of a decade that defines not only a genre, but also a culture and a way of life.

During the Spring of 2009, U-Jean and his producer partners founded Whazz Crackin, a music production company, which since late 2010 alone has created 15 fully mastered and ready to print modern hip-hop and dance tracks with 4 dynamic artists. U-Jean has written and recorded songs with and for some of the most well-known and sought after recording companies in Europe.

Music career

2011-present: Breakthrough
In 2011 U-Jean meets Yanou and Dj Manian (Zooland Records), the producers of Cascada and RIO. They record the hits “Turn This Club Around”, “Animal” and “Summer Jam” which places them number three on the Media Control Charts, number one on iTunes and gets them six times gold in Germany, Austria and Switzerland.   
By this time U-Jean has also become one of the most renowned featuring artists in Europe. His success is marked out due to collaborations with acts such as DJ Antoine (House Party), Mischa Daniels, Jenson Vaughan, Mike Candy's (Paradise) and many others.

Discography

Singles

As lead artist

As featured artist

Guest appearances

References

External links
 on Instagram
 U-Jean on Facebook
 U-Jean on Twitter

African-American male singers
Singers from Ohio
American male singers
German people of African-American descent
German male singers